Zach Villa (born March 17, 1987) is an American actor, singer, songwriter, dancer, and musician. Villa was born in Clinton, Iowa. He is best known for his role as real-life serial killer Richard Ramirez in the ninth season of the FX anthology horror series American Horror Story, titled American Horror Story: 1984, and his artistic experience through the band Cylvia. Villa plays piano, drums, bass, guitar, and violin.

Personal life 
He was born to Mexican parents in Clinton, Iowa. In January 2015, Villa and his bandmate Evan Rachel Wood announced they were engaged. Their band was called Rebel and a Basketcase. The couple ended their engagement in September 2017.

Since June 2017, Villa is lead vocalist and guitarist  in the band Sorry Kyle.

Filmography

Film

Television

Video games

References

External links

1986 births
Living people
21st-century American male actors
Male actors from Iowa
American male actors of Mexican descent
American male television actors
Interlochen Center for the Arts alumni
Juilliard School alumni